The 1964 Oklahoma State Cowboys football team represented Oklahoma State University–Stillwater in the Big Eight Conference during the 1964 NCAA University Division football season. In their second season under head coach Phil Cutchin, the Cowboys compiled a 4–6 record (3–4 against conference opponents), tied for fifth place in the conference, and were outscored by opponents by a combined total of 192 to 165.

On offense, the 1964 team averaged 16.5 points scored, 139.7 rushing yards, and 81.0 passing yards per game.  On defense, the team allowed an average of 19.2 points scored, 222.6 rushing yards, and 128.1 passing yards per game. The team's statistical leaders included Walt Garrison with 730 rushing yards, Glenn Baxter with 845 passing yards, Tony Sellari with 238 receiving yards, and placekicker Charles Durkee with 37 points scored.

End Jack Jacobson was selected as a first-team All-Big Eight Conferense player.

The team played its home games at Lewis Field in Stillwater, Oklahoma.

Schedule

After the season

The 1965 NFL Draft was held on November 28, 1964. The following Cowboy was selected.

References

Oklahoma State
Oklahoma State Cowboys football seasons
Oklahoma State Cowboys football